Andhra Pradesh Football Association (APFA), formerly the Andhra Football Association,  is the state governing body of football in Andhra Pradesh. It is affiliated with the All India Football Federation, the national governing body.

The sports federation was formed in 1959 following the merger of the Hyderabad Football Association with the Andhra Football Association under the auspices of the then AIFF Vice-President Shiv Kumar Lal to form the Andhra Pradesh Football Association.

References

Football in Andhra Pradesh
Football governing bodies in India
1959 establishments in India
Sports organizations established in 1959